Junzo Kawamori (24 November 1941 – 12 August 2017) was a Japanese professional tennis player.

Born in the city of Ashiya in Hyōgo Prefecture, Kawamori attended junior high school together with future Davis Cup teammate Koji Watanabe and completed his studies at Konan University.

Kawamori, a two-time doubles winner at the All Japan Championships, represented Japan as a doubles specialist in four Davis Cup ties. One of his Davis Cup appearances was in Japan's 1971 win over Australia, which was the country's first triumph over their Eastern Zone rival for 50-years.

See also
List of Japan Davis Cup team representatives

References

External links
 
 

1941 births
2017 deaths
Japanese male tennis players
Sportspeople from Hyōgo Prefecture
20th-century Japanese people
21st-century Japanese people